Fahd Youssef (born May 15, 1987) is a Syrian football player who is currently playing for Al-Shorta in the Iraqi Premier League.
he made his debut with Syria at age of 27, against Singapore in AFC world cup qualifiers.
he is known for his speed abilities and skills.

Honours

Club
Al-Shorta
Iraqi Premier League: 2021–22
Iraqi Super Cup: 2022

Individual
 October player in the Iraqi Premier League 2022-23

References

External links
 Career stats at goalzz.com

1987 births
Living people
Syrian footballers
Syrian expatriate footballers
Syrian expatriate sportspeople in Jordan
Expatriate footballers in Jordan
Syrian expatriate sportspeople in Qatar
Expatriate footballers in Qatar
Association football forwards
Assyrian/Syriac Syrians
Syrian people of Assyrian descent
Syrian Christians
People from Qamishli
Qatar Stars League players
Al-Wehdat SC players
Al-Jazeera (Jordan) players
That Ras Club players
Al-Sailiya SC players
Al-Shorta SC players
2019 AFC Asian Cup players
Assyrian footballers
Syrian Premier League players
Syria international footballers